Lège-Cap-Ferret is a commune in the Gironde department in Nouvelle-Aquitaine in southwestern France. The commune stretches along the length of the Cap Ferret peninsula, from the village of Lège in the north to the point of Cap Ferret in the south.

Population

Climate

International relations
The commune is twinned with:
 Sandhausen, Germany, since 1980
 Úbeda, Spain, since 1983

See also
 Cap Ferret
 Grand Piquey
 Communes of the Gironde department

References

Communes of Gironde